Buyengero is a commune of Rumonge Province in southwestern Burundi.  The capital is Buyengero.

References

Communes of Burundi
Rumonge Province